The International Conference on Nuclear Disarmament took place in Oslo on 26 and 27 February 2008. It was organized by The Government of Norway, the Norwegian Radiation Protection Authority in collaboration with the NTI (Nuclear Threat Initiative) and the Hoover Institute. The Conference, entitled "Achieving the Vision of a World Free of Nuclear Weapons", had the purpose of building consensus between nuclear 
weapon states and non-nuclear weapon states and about the importance of all the actions in the NPT.

The specific aims were twofold:

To identify and formulate disarmament, non-proliferation and nuclear risk  reduction proposals that can realistically be implemented in the mid-term  (2–5 years)
To discuss long-term objectives and how progress can be made toward achieving them.

The conference focused on the discussion over several issues, some of them were: what nuclear-weapon states and non-nuclear-weapon states can do to reduce the role of nuclear weapons in national security policies, how regional conflicts impact efforts to reduce nuclear dangers, the role of treaties and ways of reconciling nuclear energy expansion with nonproliferation efforts.

The panelists 

The panelists were:

 Dr. Alexei Arbatov Scholar-in-Residence, Carnegie Moscow Center
 Ms. Irma Arguello Founder and chairwoman, Nonproliferation for Global Security Foundation - NPSGlobal, Buenos Aires 
 Dr. Bruce Blair President, World Security Institute, Washington D.C. 
 Dr. Hans Blix Chairman, The Weapons of Mass Destruction Commission, Stockholm
 Ambassador Richard Butler Convenor, Canberra Commission on the Elimination of Nuclear Weapons 
 Dr. Shahram Chubin Director of Studies, Geneva Centre for Security Policy
 Mr. Jayantha Dhanapala Visiting professor, Simon Fraser University
 Dr. Sidney Drell Senior Fellow, Hoover Institution, Stanford University 
 Ambassador Sergio Duarte High Representative for Disarmament Affairs, United Nations, New York City
 Mr. Robert Einhorn Senior Adviser, Center for Strategic and International Studies, Washington D.C.
 Dr. Mohamed ElBaradei Director General, IAEA, Vienna 
 Dr. Ali Fahmy El-Saiedi Executive Advisor to the Board, Power Generation Engineering and Services Co., Cairo 
 Mr. Gareth Evans President and Chief Executive, International Crisis Group, Brussels
 Mr. Mark Fitzpatrick Senior Fellow for Non-proliferation, International Institute for Strategic Studies, London 
 Ms. Annalisa Giannella Personal Representative to the High Representative for Non-Proliferation of Weapons of Mass Destruction, Council of the European Union, Brussels 
 Dr. Pierre Goldschmidt Visiting Fellow, Carnegie Endowment for International Peace, Washington D.C. 
 Ambassador James Goodby Visiting Fellow, Hoover Institution, Stanford University 
 Ms. Rose Gottemoeller Director, Carnegie Moscow Center 
 Dr. Patricia Lewis Director, United Nations Institute for Disarmament Research, Geneva 
 Ambassador Abdul Samad Minty Deputy Director-General and Special Representative on Disarmament Affairs, Department of Foreign Affairs, Pretoria 
 Ambassador Takeshi Nakane Director General, Disarmament, Non-proliferation and Science Department, Ministry of Foreign Affairs, Tokyo 
 Senator Sam Nunn Co-chairman and chief executive officer, Nuclear Threat Initiative, Washington D.C. 
 Dr. George Perkovich Vice President for Studies–Global Security and Economic Development, Carnegie Endowment for International Peace, Washington D.C. 
 Sir Michael Quinlan Consulting Senior Fellow, International Institute for Strategic Studies, London 
 Mr. Vasantha R. Raghavan Lt. Gen. (Ret.) and Director, Delhi Policy Group 
 Dr. Ramamurti Rajaraman Co-chair, International Panel on Fissile Materials 
 Ms. Joan Rohlfing Senior Vice President for Programs & Operations, Nuclear Threat Initiative, Washington D.C. 
 Dr. Dingli Shen Professor, Center for American Studies, Fudan University, Shanghai 
 Secretary George Shultz Distinguished Fellow, Hoover Institution, Stanford University 
 Mr. Jonas Gahr Støre Ministry of Foreign Affairs, Norway, Oslo

See also
Nuclear disarmament

References

External links
International Conference on Nuclear Disarmament

Anti–nuclear weapons movement